Zero Effect is a 1998 American mystery comedy film written and directed by Jake Kasdan in his feature directional debut. Starring Bill Pullman as "the world's most private detective", Daryl Zero, and Ben Stiller as his assistant Steve Arlo, the film's plot is loosely based on the Arthur Conan Doyle short story "A Scandal in Bohemia".

Shot in Portland, Oregon and scored by The Greyboy Allstars, the film was screened in the Un Certain Regard section at the 1998 Cannes Film Festival.

The film did not perform well at the box-office grossing $2 million with a budget of $5 million.

Plot
Daryl Zero is the world's greatest detective, but is also a socially maladroit misanthrope. Among his quirks is that he never meets or has direct contact with his clients, instead conducting business through his assistant, Steve Arlo. Throughout the movie, Zero provides narration as he reads lines from his proposed autobiography.

Zero and Arlo are hired by Portland area millionaire Gregory Stark, who has lost the key to a safe deposit box and is being blackmailed by an unknown person who forces him to follow elaborate instructions to deliver the cash payments. Zero quickly discovers that the blackmailer is Gloria Sullivan, an EMT with a mysterious past. Zero becomes attracted to Gloria and they sleep together, compromising his trademark objectivity. He lets his guard down and tells her that his abusive father killed his mother and himself.

Stark pressures Arlo to reveal the blackmailer's identity so that he can have that person killed. Arlo must also deal with Zero's absurd demands on his time, which increasingly interfere with Arlo's relationship with his girlfriend Jess.

Zero eventually discovers that Stark had raped Gloria's mother after she broke up with him. She later blackmailed Stark with the threat of exposing him as a rapist, so he had her killed. However, she had already given birth to their daughter Gloria, who was discovered and raised by the hitman who killed her mother. Gloria grew up knowing that Stark was behind her mother's murder, and when her adoptive father (the hitman) contracted a terminal illness, she used the information to  blackmail Stark, using the money to pay for medical treatment.

At the meeting to deliver the final blackmail payment, Stark collapses from a heart attack and Gloria is compelled to save his life. She then flees the country with Zero's assistance.

Cast
 Bill Pullman as Daryl Zero
 Ben Stiller as Steve Arlo
 Ryan O'Neal as Gregory Stark
 Kim Dickens as Gloria Sullivan
 Angela Featherstone as Jess

Soundtrack
Released in January 1998 on Work Group, the official soundtrack for the film includes:

 "Mystery Dance" – Elvis Costello
 "One Dance" – Dan Bern
 "Starbucked" – Bond
 "Into My Arms" – Nick Cave and the Bad Seeds
 "Some Jingle Jangle Morning" – Mary Lou Lord
 "Emma J" – Brendan Benson
 "The Method Pt. 2" – The Greyboy Allstars
 "Drifting Along" – Jamiroquai
 "Till You Die" – Candy Butchers
 "Lounge" – Esthero
 "Blackmail Drop" – The Greyboy Allstars
 "Three Days" – Thermadore
 "Rest My Head Against the Wall" – Heatmiser
 "The Zero Effect" – The Greyboy Allstars

Reception
Rotten Tomatoes, a review aggregator, reports that 65% of 52 surveyed critics gave the film a positive review; the average rating is 6.8/10.  The site's consensus reads: "A promising debut for writer/director Jake Kasdan, Zero Effect overcomes its flaws with its off-kilter humor and likeable leads."  Leonard Klady of Variety called it "scattershot entertainment that misses as often as it hits its targets".  Roger Ebert of the Chicago Sun-Times rated 3.5/4 stars and wrote that he was surprised by how involved he became in the film.  Janet Maslin of The New York Times wrote of the film's focus on the relation between Pullman and Stiller, "For all its admirable ambitions, this loosely focused first feature has the makings of a better buddy story than detective tale anyhow."  Jack Matthews of the Los Angeles Times called it "a confident first film and one of the freshest detective yarns to come along in a while".  Ruthe Stein of The San Francisco Chronicle rated it 2/4 stars and called it "more an interesting idea for a detective movie than it is an interesting film".  Lisa Schwarzbaum of Entertainment Weekly rated it C+ and called it "a very shaggy and minor comedy".  Geoff Andrew of Time Out London wrote, "Kasdan's is a very promising debut, its own dearth of feeling offset by able writing, engaging playing and a sure sense of pace."

Audiences polled by CinemaScore gave the film an average grade of "C+" on an A+ to F scale.

Television pilot
In 2002 Kasdan attempted to resurrect the character Daryl Zero for the NBC television network. He shared the screenwriting duties with Walon Green and directed the pilot. He was also one of the producers. The series was intended to be a prequel, tracing the early adventures of Zero as he and Arlo became a team. The pilot stars Alan Cumming as Daryl Zero and features Krista Allen and Natasha Gregson Wagner. NBC did not pick up the pilot.

References

External links
 
 
 
 

1998 films
1990s comedy mystery films
American comedy mystery films
American comedy thriller films
1990s English-language films
1990s comedy thriller films
American detective films
1998 directorial debut films
Films set in Oregon
Films shot in Portland, Oregon
Columbia Pictures films
Castle Rock Entertainment films
Films directed by Jake Kasdan
1998 comedy films
Works based on Sherlock Holmes
Films produced by Lisa Henson
1990s American films